is a Japanese tokusatsu drama in the Toei Company's Kamen Rider franchise. It is the twenty-ninth Kamen Rider series overall as well as the twentieth and final series in the Heisei period. The show premiered on September 2, 2018, following the finale of Kamen Rider Build, joining Kaitou Sentai Lupinranger VS Keisatsu Sentai Patranger and later, the miniseries Super Sentai Strongest Battle, followed by Kishiryu Sentai Ryusoulger, in the Super Hero Time line-up.

The series has a time travel/multiverse motif while paying tribute to all of the previous Heisei-era Kamen Riders due to being a spiritual sequel to Kamen Rider Decade. The series and related films also feature returning actors reprising their roles from the previous Heisei series.

Plot

Sougo Tokiwa, a high school senior born in the year 2000, dreams of one day becoming a king. Suddenly, he meets a mysterious girl hailing from the year 2068, named Tsukuyomi, who comes with an ominous warning: Sougo will become Ohma Zi-O, the tyrannical Overlord of Time. Despite being troubled by his potential fate, Sougo becomes Kamen Rider Zi-O to save the space-time continuum from the Time Jackers, a group seeking to alter the history of the Heisei Kamen Riders for their ends. He is aided in his quest by Geiz Myokoin, a resistance fighter also from 2068 capable of becoming Kamen Rider Geiz who initially intended to kill Sougo to prevent his future tyranny, and a self-titled prophet named Woz, who wants the youth to become the tyrant Ohma Zi-O, who later gains the power to become Kamen Rider Woz. Along their journey, Sougo and his friends meet several Kamen Riders from the past and their allies; earning their trust and obtaining their powers.

Following his high school graduation, Sougo discovers that Swartz, the Time Jackers' leader, is Tsukuyomi's older brother and was manipulating both the Riders and his fellow Jackers in his plan to fuse the entirety of the Kamen Rider multiverse into a single, unified world to destroy it and save his world. Despite their best efforts, Sougo and his allies fail to stop Swartz until the former accepts his destiny and becomes Ohma Zi-O to destroy him. However, instead of taking control of the world as foretold of him, Sougo renounces his powers to undo Swartz's damage; creating a new reality where he lives in peace with Geiz, Tsukuyomi, and the other Time Jackers.

Production
The Kamen Rider Zi-O trademark was registered by Toei on April 12, 2018.

Episodes

As the show pays tribute to the Heisei period Kamen Riders, each tribute episode title consists of a short phrase related to a particular Heisei Rider series and a year relevant to it. Throughout the series, Zi-O's predecessor, Kamen Rider Decade's, involvement steadily becomes more prevalent, with "*" denoting episodes where his or his associate Kamen Rider Diend's involvement overlapped with another Rider's tribute episode.
This series is divided into four arcs:
Episode 1-16 - Birth of Zi-O: This arc introduces most of the main characters and the plot. It also pays tribute to Kamen Rider Build, Ex-Aid, Fourze, Faiz, Wizard, OOO, Gaim, and Ghost*.
Episode 17-30 - Ohma's Day: This arc features White Woz, who seeks to create Geiz Revive using the power of three future Riders, and the preparation of Ohma's Day. It also features tributes to Kamen Rider Ryuki and Blade*, as well as delves into Sougo's past.
Episode 31-40 - Road to the King: This arc delves into Tsukuyomi's past as she regains her memories. It also features tributes to Kamen Rider Agito, Hibiki, Kiva, Kabuto*, and Den-O.
Episode 41-49 - The New Lord*: This sees Swartz's real plan come to light and Sougo becoming Ohma Zi-O. It also features tributes to Kamen Rider Drive and the movie-exclusive Riders.

Films
Kamen Rider Zi-O made his first appearance as a cameo in the film Kamen Rider Build the Movie: Be the One.

Heisei Generations Forever

A Movie War film, titled  was released on December 22, 2018, featuring the casts of Kamen Rider Zi-O, Kamen Rider Build, and Kamen Rider Den-O. Actor Shunsuke Daitō portrayed the film's main antagonist, the Super Time Jacker Tid, and actor Kenichi Takitō voiced the Imagin Futaros. Aside from Build, actors Toshiki Kashu (Kamen Rider Agito), Takamasa Suga (Kamen Rider Ryuki), Masahiro Inoue (Kamen Rider Decade) and Shun Nishime (Kamen Rider Ghost) returned to vocally reprise their respective roles, while Takeru Satoh (Kamen Rider Den-O) physically reprised his role as Ryotaro Nogami. This film is a shared tribute to Kamen Rider Kuuga, Kamen Rider Den-O and Kamen Rider W.

Over Quartzer

 was released on July 26, 2019, double-billed with the film for Kishiryu Sentai Ryusoulger. Japanese boy band Da Pump portrayed the Quartzers, the movie's main antagonists, with Kamen Rider Barlckxs portrayed by Da Pump vocalist ISSA while Zyuden Sentai Kyoryugers choreographer Papaya Suzuki and actor Syuusuke Saito portrayed Kamen Riders Zonjis and Zamonas respectively. Additionally, Kamen Rider Drives Yu Inaba and Chris Peppler returned to reprise their roles. This film is a shared tribute to  Kamen Rider Drive, the Heisei era's Showa era-themed Kamen Rider series (Black RX, Shin, ZO, J, and Amazons), and the entire Heisei Kamen Rider Series as a whole. It also introduced the first Kamen Rider of the Reiwa period, Kamen Rider Zero-One. This movie takes place after episode 43 and also serves as an alternate ending to the series.

Reiwa The First Generation

A Movie War film, titled  was released on December 21, 2019, featuring the casts of Zi-O and Kamen Rider Zero-One. This film is a shared tribute to Kamen Rider Zero-One, the original Kamen Rider, and the entire Heisei Kamen Rider Series as a whole. The events of the film take place after the end of the main series.

Special episodes
 is a web-exclusive series released on Toei Tokusatsu Fan Club. It accompanies the airing of the main series' episode the day after it.
Episode 1.5: 
Episode 2.5: 
Episode 3.5: 
Episode 4.5: 
Episode 5.5: 
Episode 6.5: 
Episode 7.5: 
Episode 8.5: 
Episode 9.5: 
Episode 10.5: 
Episode 11.5: 
Episode 12.5: 
Episode 13.5: 
Episode 14.5: 
Episode 15.5: 
Episode 16.5: 
Rider Time is a web-exclusive spin-off series. Each comprises three episodes.
: Released on Toei Tokusatsu Fan Club on March 31, 2019, written by Kaori Kaneko, and directed by Takayuki Shibasaki. Aside from the newly introduced secondary Rider of 2022, Kamen Rider Hattari, it briefly shows four more unnamed ninja Kamen Riders in the third episode's ending. The theme song is "IZANAGI", performed by Sakuramen feat. Hideya Tawada.

: Part of the spin-off collaboration with the titular Kamen Rider of 2002. Released on Video Pass on March 31, 2019, written by Toshiki Inoue, and directed by Takayuki Shibasaki, the storyline is a sequel to the original Ryuki TV series, which features the sudden revival of the Mirror World's Rider War. Takamasa Suga, Satoshi Matsuda, Hassei Takano, Satoshi Ichijo, Tomohisa Yuge, Takashi Hagino, and Tsuyoshi Koyama reprised their respective roles. It also introduces Kamen Rider Abyss from Kamen Rider Decade to the main universe and features appearances by Zi-O and Geiz. The theme song is "Go! Now! ~Alive A life neo~", performed by Rica Matsumoto. Even though Kamen Rider Zi-O producer Shinichiro Shirakura says this storyline takes place before episode 21, it may actually take place between episodes 28 and 29, as evidenced by Zi-O not having Ryuki's Ridewatch until the events of the latter episode.
Advent Again
Another Alternative
Alive a Life
: Released on Telasa on February 9, 2021, written by Toshiki Inoue, and directed by Satoshi Morota. The theme song is "INSIDE-OUT ZI-O ver.", performed by Sougo Tokiwa (So Okuno) & Tsukasa Kadoya (Masahiro Inoue).

: Released on Toei Tokusatsu Fan Club on February 9, 2021, written by Toshiki Inoue, and directed by Satoshi Morota. This series takes place before Kamen Rider Zi-O vs. Decade: 7 of Zi-Os!. Additionally, Ryouta Murai (Kamen Rider Decade) reprised his role. The theme song is "INSIDE-OUT DECADE ver.", performed by Tsukasa Kadoya (Masahiro Inoue) & Sougo Tokiwa (So Okuno).
The First Stage
The Next Stage
The Final Stage
 is Televi-Kuns  for Kamen Rider Zi-O. The events of this specials takes place before episode 45.

Kamen Rider Zi-O Next Time
 is a V-Cinema release that focuses on a side story starring Geiz Myokoin. The events of the V-Cinema take place after the end of the main series and Kamen Rider Reiwa: The First Generation. The V-Cinema is written by Nobuhiro Mouri and directed by Satoshi Morota and was released on April 22, 2020. Kimito Totani (Kamen Rider Decade), Kōhei Murakami (Kamen Rider 555), Minehiro Kinomoto (Kamen Rider W), and Hiroaki Iwanaga (Kamen Rider OOO) returned to reprise their respective roles. The theme song is "Brand New Day" performed by Triplane.

Novel
, written by Kento Shimoyama, is part of a series of spin-off novel adaptions of the Heisei Era Kamen Riders. The events of the novel take place after the end of the main series. The novel was released on July 28, 2021.

Video game
This game was released on November 29, 2018 for the Nintendo Switch.

Cast
: 
: 
: 
: 
: 
: 
: 
: 
: 
: 
: 
Opening Narration, : 
Ziku-Driver Equipment Voice: Rikya Koyama, 
BeyonDriver Equipment Voice: 
Neo DecaDriver Voice, Neo DienDriver Voice: 
Narration:

Guest cast

Resistance captain (1): 
: 
: 
: 
: 
: 
: 
: 
: 
: 
: 
: 
: 
: 
: 
: 
: 
: 
: 
: 
: 
: 
: 
: 
: 
: 
: 
: 
Manager (25, 26): 
: 
: 
: 
: 
: 
: 
, : 
: 
: 
: 
Young beauty (36): 
: 
: 
: 
: 
: 
: 
: 
: 
: 
: 
: 
:

Theme songs
Opening theme
"Over "Quartzer""
Lyrics: Shuta Sueyoshi, Takaki Mizoguchi
Composition: MiNE, Atsushi Shimada
Arrangement: Atsushi Shimada
Artist: Shuta Sueyoshi feat. ISSA

Insert themes

Lyrics: Shōko Fujibayashi
Composition & Arrangement: Toshihiko Sahashi
Artist: Sougo Tokiwa (So Okuno)
Episodes: 16, 22
Theme for Kamen Rider Zi-O
"FUTURE GUARDIAN"
Lyrics: Shōko Fujibayashi
Composition & Arrangement: Toshihiko Sahashi
Artist: Geiz Myokoin (Gaku Oshida)
Episodes: 19
Theme for Kamen Rider Geiz
"Black & White"
Lyrics: Megane Hirai
Composition & Arrangement: Go Sakabe
Artist: Woz (Keisuke Watanabe)
Episodes: 38
Theme for Kamen Rider Woz
"Next New Wφrld"
Lyrics: Ricky
Composition & Arrangement: nishi-ken
Artist: Rider Chips
Episodes: 40
Theme for Kamen Rider Grand Zi-O
The following opening and insert themes from previous series are reused in Zi-O: "BELIEVE YOURSELF" from Kamen Rider Agito in episode 32 and "Kagayaki" from Kamen Rider Hibiki in episode 34.

References

External links
Official website at TV Asahi(In Japanese)
Official website at Toei Company
Kamen Rider Zi-O Next Time: Geiz, Majesty website

 
2018 Japanese television series debuts
2019 Japanese television series endings
TV Asahi original programming
Crossover tokusatsu television series
Japanese time travel television series
Kamen Rider television series